The 1987 season of the African Cup Winners' Cup football club tournament was won by Gor Mahia in two-legged final victory against Espérance Sportive de Tunis. This was the thirteenth season that the tournament took place for the winners of each African country's domestic cup. Thirty-five sides entered the competition, with Libya F.C. disqualified before the 1st leg of the preliminary round, Real Republicans withdrawing before the 1st leg of the same round and finally, Ela Nguema and SC de Bafatá withdrawing before the 1st leg of the first round.

Preliminary round

|}

1: Royal Lesotho Defence Force FC won 5-3 PSO
2: Real Republicans withdrew.
3: Libya FC were disqualified.

First round

|}

1: Elá Nguema withdrew
2: Miembeni won 5-2 PSO.
3: Entente II won on away goals.
4: SC de Bafatá withdrew.

Second round

|}

1: Abiola Babes won 4-2 PSO
2: Gor Mahia won on away goals.
3: Dragons de l'Ouémé won 4-2 PSO.

Quarter finals

|}

Semi finals

|}

Final

|}
1: Gor Mahia won on away goals

External links
 Results available on CAF Official Website
 Results available on RSSSF

African Cup Winners' Cup
2